Visnes is a village in Karmøy municipality in Rogaland county, Norway.

Visnes has a local copper mine that provided material for the Statue of Liberty in New York City.  The copper at this site was first discovered in 1865. Visnes was the site of one of the most active of the Norwegian copper mines in history. During the 1870s, it was the largest copper mine in Norway. Up to 70% of Norway's copper export came from Visnes, which at that time was one of northern Europe's largest mines. This mine was in full operation throughout much of the latter half of the 19th century and was not fully closed until 1972. The copper mine has its own museum, Visnes Gruvemuseum.

References

External links
Visnes Gruvemuseum

Villages in Rogaland
Karmøy